Merkezefendi is a new intracity district and second level municipality in Denizli Province, Turkey. According to Law act no 6360, all Turkish provinces with a population more than 750000, were declared metropolitan municipality. The law also created new  districts within the capital city  which have second level municipalities in addition the metropolitan municipality. Merkezefendi  is one of them.

Thus after 2014 a part of Denizli central district was named Merkezefendi and the name Denizli was  reserved for the metropolitan municipality. (Merkez Efendi was the name of a 16th-century Sufi )

Sport 
Merkezefendi Belediyesi Denizli Basket represents Merkezefendi and Denizli in Turkish Basketball Super League (BSL).

Rural area
There were two towns and six villages in the rural area of Merkezefendi. Now their official status became "neighborhood of Merkezefendi"

.

See also
Merkez Efendi

References

Districts of Denizli Province
Merkezefendi District